Seven ships of the Royal Navy have borne the name HMS Sandfly. A sandfly is an irritating insect found near beaches.

  was a 4-gun  launched in 1794. She was broken up in 1803.
  was an  wooden screw gunboat launched in 1855. She was sold for scrap in 1867.
  was a two-gun paddle gunboat. She was formerly Tasmanian Maid and was purchased by the New Zealand colonial government for use in the New Zealand Wars in 1863. Wrecked on Kawarau Reef, New Plymouth, 1868.
  was a one-gun survey schooner launched in 1872. She was broken up in 1883.
  was a  launched in 1887. She was sold in 1905.
  was a coastal destroyer launched in 1906. She was renamed TB-4 later in 1906 and sold in 1920.
  was an  launched in 1911. She was sold in 1921.

References

Royal Navy ship names